Elections to Stafford Borough Council were held on 1 May 2003. All 59 seats on the council were up for election, with boundary changes meaning the number was reduced from 60. There were elections held in 24 wards, with a further 2 wards (Church Eaton and Milwich) uncontested. The Conservative Party gained majority control of the council after the council was under no overall control prior to the election. Overall turnout was 37.51%, with the lowest turnout (24.08%) in Coton ward and the highest (55.77%) in Seighford. As a result of the election, the new council leader was Cllr. Judith Dalgarno.

Election result

|}

The total number of seats on the Council after the election was:
Conservative Party - 40
Labour - 14
Liberal Democrats - 5
Sources: BBC Stafford Borough Council

Results by ward
All results from Stafford Borough Council.

Barlaston and Oulton (2 seats)

Baswich (2 seats)

Chartley (1 seat)

Church Eaton (1 seat)

Common (2 seats)

Coton (2 seats)

Eccleshall (3 seats)

Forebridge (2 seats)

Fulford (3 seats)

Gnosall and Woodseaves (3 seats)

Haywood and Hixon (3 seats)

Highfields and Western Downs (3 seats)

Holmcroft (3 seats)

Littleworth (3 seats)

Manor (3 seats)

Milford (2 seat)

Milwich (1 seat)

Penkside (2 seats)

Rowley (2 seats)

Seighford (2 seats)

St Michael's (2 seats)

Stonefield and Christchurch (2 seats)

Swynnerton (2 seats)

Tillington (2 seats)

Walton (3 seats)

Weeping Cross (3 seats)

2003 English local elections
2003
2000s in Staffordshire